David Spangler Kaufman (December 18, 1813 – January 31, 1851) was an attorney, politician, and diplomat, serving as U.S. Representative from Texas. When the Republic of Texas was independent, he served in both houses of its legislature, and as chargé d'affaires of Texas to the United States.

Early life and education

David Spangler Kaufman was born in Boiling Springs, Pennsylvania, the son of Mary (Spangler) and Abraham Landis Kaufman. He was of German-Jewish ancestry, and his paternal great-grandfather was a Mennonite minister. Kaufman, Texas was named for David Spangler Kaufman, the son of Abraham and Mary (Spangler) Kaufman. Abraham was the son of John and Christianna (Landis) Kaufman; John was the son of Frederick Kaufman, a Mennonite minister. Frederick was the immigrant Kaufman ancestor, arriving in Philadelphia on 21 September 1742, at a time of strong German immigration to the colony.</ref> Kaufman pursued classical studies and was graduated from The College of New Jersey in 1833.

Kaufman moved to Natchez, Mississippi, where he studied law with John A. Quitman from New York. Kaufman was admitted to the bar in Natchez. He commenced practice in Natchitoches, Louisiana, in 1835. Attracted to the developing country in the Southwest, Kaufman moved in 1837 to Nacogdoches, Republic of Texas.

Military service

Kaufman served in the military against the Cherokee people in the Texas-Indian Wars. He was wounded at the Battle of the Neches in 1839. These Cherokee had migrated to Texas from their territory in the American Southeast, to avoid being removed to Indian Territory, but the Texas president wanted to push them out of the republic.

Political career

He served as a member of the Texas House of Representatives from 1838 to1843. He served in the Texas Senate from 1843 to 1845.  He was appointed chargé d'affaires of Texas to the United States in 1845.

Upon the admission of Texas as a state into the Union, Kaufman was elected as a Democrat to the 29th United States Congress.  He was re-elected to the 30th and 31st Congresses, serving from March 30, 1846, until 1851. He served as chairman of the Committee on Rules (31st Congress).

Death

Kaufman died from a heart attack in Washington, DC, on January 31, 1851. Kaufman was originally interred in the Congressional Cemetery in Washington, DC. In 1932, his remains were moved and he was reinterred in the Texas State Cemetery at Austin.

Fraternal memberships

Freemasons
 The Philosophical Society of Texas

Legacy and honors
Kaufman County, Texas is named for him, as is its seat, Kaufman.

See also

List of United States Congress members who died in office (1790–1899)

References

Further reading

External links
 David Spangler Kaufman at the Handbook of Texas Online
 
 

1813 births
1851 deaths
American people of German descent
Burials at Texas State Cemetery
Louisiana lawyers
Immigrants to the Republic of Texas
Diplomats of the Republic of Texas
Democratic Party members of the Texas House of Representatives
People from Cumberland County, Pennsylvania
Princeton University alumni
Democratic Party Texas state senators
American military personnel of the Indian Wars
Kaufman County, Texas
Democratic Party members of the United States House of Representatives from Texas
19th-century American politicians
19th-century American lawyers